The Admiral Hotel may refer to:

Admiral Hotel (Copenhagen), Denmark
Admiral Hotel (Manila), Philippines
Admiral Hotel (Mobile, Alabama), United States